Sabatinca aemula is a species of moth belonging to the family Micropterigidae. It is endemic to New Zealand and is found in the north western parts of the South Island. The larvae of this species has yet to be collected but it has been hypothesised that the larvae subsist on foliose liverworts similar to other species in the Sabatinca genus. The adults of the species are on the wing from the middle of September until the end of December. The adults of S. aemula are very similar in appearance to S. chrysargyra and it has been argued they can only be distinguished by dissection. However more recent research suggests that the colour patterns on the forewings of the two species can be sufficient to distinguish between the two species.

Taxonomy 
This species was described by Alfred Philpott in 1924. He used specimens collected in the Cobb Valley, in December amongst rough herbage and undergrowth at a damp spot on the edge of the forest. The male holotype specimen is held in the New Zealand Arthropod Collection. In 2014 Gibbs synonymised S. aurantiaca as a junior synonym of S. aemula stating that further collecting of specimens revealed a continuous series of colour form removed the justification for S. aurantiaca.

Description
The larvae of this species are yet to be collected.
 
Philpott described the adults of the species as follows:

This species is very similar in appearance to Sabatinca chrysargyra and the two are arguably indistinguishable in the field. Dissection of genitalia has been claimed as being required to distinguish between the two species. However more recently it has been suggested that the forewing patterns of S. chrysargyra is sufficiently different to enable the two species to be distinguished. Sandra R. Schachat and Richard L. Brown have stated that

Both species are on the wing during the same time period in the year and are found in very close localities with S. aemula being found in the north west parts of the Tasman region north of Mount Hercules where as S. chrysargyra inhabits the Franz Josef valley southwards.

Distribution 
This species is endemic to New Zealand and is known from the Mount Arthur tableland in New Zealand. The species can be found in the Nelson, Marlborough, Buller and Westland areas. It can be found at altitudes ranging from 1100 m down to sea-level.

Behaviour 
This species is on the wing from the middle of September until the end of December and is a day flying moth.

Host species and habitat 
It has been hypothesised that the larvae of this species feed on foliose liverworts as is the case for other species in the Sabatinca genus. The host species of the adult moths has not yet been recorded. Adults have been found in habitats that have good light but are damp and humid.

References

Micropterigidae
Moths described in 1924
Endemic fauna of New Zealand
Moths of New Zealand
Taxa named by Alfred Philpott
Endemic moths of New Zealand